Henry McCann (1887 – after 1909) was a Scottish footballer who played in the Scottish Football League for Hibernian and in the English Football League and the Midland League for Lincoln City. He played as an inside left.

Notes

References

1887 births
Year of death missing
People from Stenhousemuir
Scottish footballers
Association football inside forwards
Ashfield F.C. players
Hibernian F.C. players
Lincoln City F.C. players
Scottish Football League players
English Football League players
Midland Football League players
Date of birth missing
Place of death missing